John Pulling (6 December 1814, Devon – 26 February 1879, Cambridge) was a British academic.

Porter entered Corpus Christi College, Cambridge on 7 June 1833, where he was to spend the rest of his career. He graduated BA in 1837 and MA in 1840. In that year he was also ordained and became curate at Grantchester. He was Fellow of CCC from 1838 to 1850; and was Master from then until his death. He received the degree of Doctor of Divinity (DD). He also held the living at Belchamp St Paul from 1863.

References 

 

Masters of Corpus Christi College, Cambridge
Fellows of Corpus Christi College, Cambridge
Alumni of Corpus Christi College, Cambridge
Vice-Chancellors of the University of Cambridge
1814 births
1879 deaths
19th-century English Anglican priests
Clergy from Devon